Michelle Lambert (born May 2, 1985) is an American singer-songwriter and musician, born in Covelo, California, and raised in the Bay Area. After a long career as a professional musician, she released her debut album Warrior in 2015. One of Lambert's highlights was the halftime performance at the NCAA women's basketball national semifinals (Final Four) in 2014 in front of 18,000 people at the Bridgestone Arena in Nashville, Tennessee.
On January 9, 2015, she made the front page of the Reporter-Herald in an article about her official music video Warrior that spotlights high school football players during a game.

Early life 
Michelle Lambert started studying the violin when she was two years old under the Suzuki Method, following in the footsteps of her four older siblings. At the age of 14 she was already working as a professional musician in Northern California. In 2008 she moved to Boston where she attended the Berklee College of Music majoring in Professional Music. Lambert moved to Nashville in 2011 after graduating from Berklee, to pursue a career as a studio and stage musician. In 2015 she moved to Los Angeles in order to release her debut album and focus on her solo career as a pop singer.

Lambert became Catholic at the age of 12 and briefly considered a vocation to religious life at 19. According to the singer, a visit to the Salesian Sisters ended up showing her that music was her true calling.

In an interview for Asia Pop 40, Lambert told Dom Lau (host of the show and former Channel V VJ and E! News Asia) that she considered a career in private aviation in her teenage years. She even got 100 hours of flight time while pursuing her pilot's license.

Music career

Lambert worked as a professional musician since her early teen years, career that took her to San Francisco, Boston, Nashville and Los Angeles. While in Boston she was part of the Captain Wolf Band and got featured in 3 songs from their debut CD, as a singer and songwriter. Lambert's participation on the album was so notable that she was even featured in the cover of the CD. Despite being a self-release, the album was well received and became a "jukebox star," being featured in over 28,000 jukeboxes across North America.

Michelle toured with country rapper Jessta James during 2013 and part of 2014 as a violinist and backup singer.

In 2014 she had her first experience performing overseas as part of Johnny Rodgers' band during their US Embassy and the US Department of State's American Music Abroad tour in Malaysia.

In early 2015, Lambert released her first official music video with her rendition of The Devil Went Down to Georgia featuring Regi Wooten from the Wooten Brothers on the electric guitar.

She launched her first official EP Warrior in 2015 after moving to Los Angeles. That album was a turning point in her career, the moment where she decided to pursue being a solo artist. Warrior has the collaboration of Grammy winners Shannon Sanders (president of the Nashville Grammy Chapter) and Billy Hume. It also features three time Grammy nominee Kief Brown as a co-author of " Rain on You" and singing a verse in "I'm Just a Girl". In January 2016 she was elected to be the female face of SkyHigh Radio in the UK. In February 2016 she gave a long interview to the Sound Profile Magazine, where she explains in detail how important women empowerment (that's a recurrent theme in her songs) is for her.

The second official EP Angel was released in February 2017. The album was written, executed, recorded and produced by Lambert.

In October 2017, Michelle Lambert relocated to the Bay Area in California. The move back to her native Northern California happened mainly because of the attention the release of her song My California was receiving in her home state.

Artistry

Influences
Michelle grew up in a household with five older siblings, four of them studying the violin. Being the youngest child, she was exposed to all kinds of music, from classical music to punk rock.
According to an interview for a radio station in the U.K., her biggest influences are Elvis Presley and Alison Krauss.
When she was 12, Lambert visited Scotland with her sister Heidi Clare (who is a professional bluegrass violin player), where she studied violin at the Isle of Skye with Alasdair Fraser. She visited the Western Hebrides region where she studied Celtic music. That is still a big influence in her work.

According to Lambert, Amy Winehouse,  Ed Sheeran and Macklemore became very important influences in her solo career.

Fire breathing
While working in Nashville, Lambert learned and started to use fire breathing in her live performances.

Instruments
Lambert began studying the violin at the age of 2, followed by the piano and singing at the age of 5 and drums and guitar at the age of 12. She has a major in Vocal Performance from the Berklee College of Music in Boston, where she attended on a full scholarship.
In July 2021 Lambert started using The Turtle Violin from Andrew Carruthers' Off Beat Collection in her live performances.

Discography

Extended plays

Singles

Singles as featured artist

Music videos

References

External links 

 Official Website
 
 Michelle Lambert on YouTube
 Michelle Lambert at Discogs

1985 births
Living people
Singer-songwriters from California
Feminist musicians
American women pop singers
American contraltos
20th-century American musicians
21st-century American composers
American women in electronic music
Women violinists
American electronic musicians
21st-century American violinists
American women singer-songwriters
21st-century American singers
People from Mendocino County, California
20th-century American women singers
21st-century American women singers
Catholics from California
Converts to Roman Catholicism
21st-century women composers
20th-century American singers